Alan Stevens may also refer to:

Alan Stevens (footballer) (born 1923), Australian football player
Alan Stevens (sailor) (born 1933), Hong Kong Olympic sailor
Alan Stevens (writer), British science fiction writer
 Alan Stevens, former chief executive of Central Railway

See also
 Alan Stephens (born 1952), English former footballer
 Alan Stephenson (born 1944), former footballer
 Alan Stevenson (1807–1865), Scottish lighthouse engineer
 Alan Stevenson (footballer) (born 1950), English former footballer